80 metres hurdles is a distance in hurdling ran by women until 1972 in international competitions.

Since the 1972 Summer Olympics, the event has been permanently replaced by the 100 metre hurdles.

Masters athletics
The distance, with different spacing between hurdles is still in use in Masters athletics in the Men's division over 70 years of age, and the Women's division over 40 years of age.

Youth athletics
The distance, with different spacing between hurdles is also in use in the 11- to 12-year-old division, previously called the "Midget" division.

History
First official time: 13.0 seconds, Ludmila Sychrová, Czechoslovakia, July 6, 1926
First official world record: 12.8 seconds, Eva von Bredow, Germany, June 14, 1927
First runner under 12 seconds: 11.8 seconds, Babe Didrikson, United States, August 3, 1932
First runner under 11 seconds: 10.9 seconds, Shirley Strickland, AUS, July 24, 1952
Last official world record: 10.2 seconds, Vera Korsakova, USSR, June 16, 1968
Maureen Caird's winning time of 10.39A at the 1968 Olympics is intrinsically better than the hand timed official record, but at the time, IAAF did not have any rules in place to recognize automatic times.  When those rules were put in place in 1977, which recognized records set in the 1968 Olympics in many other events, the 80 metres hurdles had been retired for almost a decade.

Olympic medalists

See also
 Women's 80 metres hurdles world record progression
 80 m hurdles medalists at Olympic Games

References

External links
 IAAF record holders
 Athletics Women's 80 metres Hurdles Medalists

Events in track and field
Hurdling
Women's athletics
Sprint hurdles